Youssou N'Dour (also known as Youssou Madjiguène Ndour; born 1 October 1959) is a Senegalese singer, songwriter, musician, composer, occasional actor, businessman, and politician. In 2004, Rolling Stone magazine described him as, "perhaps the most famous singer alive" in Senegal and much of Africa. From April 2012 to September 2013, he was Senegal's Minister of Tourism.

N'Dour helped develop a style of popular Senegalese music known by all Senegambians (including the Wolof) as mbalax, a genre that has sacred origins in the Serer music njuup tradition and ndut initiation ceremonies. He is the subject of the award-winning films Return to Gorée (2007) directed by Pierre-Yves Borgeaud and Youssou N'Dour: I Bring What I Love (2008) directed by Elizabeth Chai Vasarhelyi, which were released around the world.

In 2006, N'Dour was cast as Olaudah Equiano in the film Amazing Grace.

Early life

Ethnically, N'Dour is Serer, born to a Serer father and a Toucouleur mother. However, culturally, N'Dour is Wolof. He was born in Dakar. He started performing at age 12 and would later perform regularly with the Star Band, Dakar's most popular group during the 1970s.

Despite N'Dour's maternal connection to the traditional griot caste, he was not raised in that tradition, which he learned instead from his sibling. Although patrilineally from the noble N'Dour family, his parents' world-view encouraged a modern outlook, leaving him open to two cultures and thereby inspiring N'Dour's identity as a modern griot. As a Mouride disciple, taalibé in Wolof, a Muslim of the Mouride brotherhood, one of the large four Sufi orders in Senegambia, he often incorporated aspects of Islamic music and chants into his work.

Music career
At the age of 15, Youssou N'Dour joined Super Diamono and, in 1975, toured with the band in West Africa.

In 1976 when N'Dour was 16 years old, he signed a contract to sing with Ibra Kasse's Star Band at Kasse's Miami club in Dakar where he would become a sensation.

In 1978, N'Dour would follow as several members of the Star Band left to form Étoile de Dakar, a band that made important contributions to Senegal's newly evolving musical style called Mbalax which incorporated traditional Senegalese music into the Latin styles that had dominated Senegalese popular music. Although they quickly became one of the city's most popular bands, the group was short-lived due to internal problems. Étoile de Dakar split into two groups: Étoile 2000 and Super Étoile de Dakar.   The latter group included N'Dour,  guitarist Jimi Mbaye, bassist Habib Faye, and tama (talking drum) player Assane Thiam. Super Étoile de Dakar produced four albums on cassette in just a few months and eventually evolved into N'Dour's backing band.

By 1991, he had opened his own recording studio, and, by 1995, his own record label, Jololi.

N'Dour is one of the most celebrated African musicians in history. His mix of traditional Senegalese mbalax with eclectic influences ranging from Cuban rumba to hip hop, jazz, and soul has won him an international fan base of millions. In the West, N'Dour has collaborated with Peter Gabriel, Axelle Red, Sting, Alan Stivell, Bran Van 3000, Neneh Cherry, Wyclef Jean, Paul Simon, Bruce Springsteen, Tracy Chapman, James Newton Howard, Branford Marsalis, Ryuichi Sakamoto, Dido, Lou Reed, Bruce Cockburn, and others.

The New York Times described his voice as an "arresting tenor, a supple weapon deployed with prophetic authority". N'Dour's work absorbed the entire Senegalese musical spectrum, often filtered through the lens of genre-defying rock or pop music from outside Senegalese culture.

In July 1993, Africa Opera composed by N'Dour premiered at the Opéra Garnier for the French Festival Paris quartier d'été.

In 1994, N'Dour released his biggest international hit single, the trilingual "7 Seconds", a duet sung with Neneh Cherry.

He wrote and performed the official anthem of the 1998 FIFA World Cup with Axelle Red "La Cour des Grands (Do You Mind If I Play)".

Folk Roots magazine described him as the African Artist of the Century. He toured internationally for thirty years. He won his first American Grammy Award (best contemporary world music album) for his CD Egypt in 2005.

He is the proprietor of L'Observateur, one of the widest-circulation newspapers in Senegal, the radio station RFM (Radio Future Medias) and the TV channel TFM.

In 2002, N'Dour was honoured with a Prince Claus Award, under that year's theme "Languages and transcultural forms of expression".

In 2006, N'Dour played the role of the African-British abolitionist Olaudah Equiano in the movie Amazing Grace, which chronicled the efforts of William Wilberforce to end slavery in the British Empire.

In 2008, N'Dour offered one of his compositions, Bébé, for the French singer Cynthia Brown.

In 2011, N'Dour was awarded an honorary doctoral degree in music from Yale University.

In 2013, N'Dour won a share of Sweden's $150,000 Polar music prize for promoting understanding between faiths as well as for his music.

Activism
N'Dour was nominated as Goodwill Ambassador of the Food and Agriculture Organization of the United Nations (FAO) on 16 October 2000.

In Senegal, N'Dour became a powerful cultural icon, actively involved in social issues. In 1985, he organized a concert for the release of Nelson Mandela. He was a featured performer in the 1988 worldwide Amnesty International Human Rights Now! Tour collaborating with Lou Reed on a version of the Peter Gabriel song "Biko" which was produced by Richard James Burgess and featured on the Amnesty International benefit album The Secret Policeman's Third Ball. He worked with the United Nations and UNICEF, and he started Project Joko to open internet cafés in Africa and to connect Senegalese communities around the world.

In 2003, N'Dour cancelled an upcoming American tour in order to publicly deny support for the upcoming American invasion of Iraq. In a public statement explaining his decision, N'Dour said:It is my strong conviction that the responsibility for disarming Iraq should rest with the United Nations. As a matter of conscience I question the United States government's apparent intention to commence war in Iraq. I believe that coming to America at this time would be perceived in many parts of the world--rightly or wrongly--as support for this policy, and that, as a consequence, it is inappropriate to perform in the US at this juncture.He performed in three of the Live 8 concerts (in Live 8 concert, London, Live 8 concert, Paris and at the Live 8 concert, Eden Project in Cornwall) on 2 July 2005, with Dido. He covered John Lennon's "Jealous Guy" for the 2007 CD Instant Karma: The Amnesty International Campaign to Save Darfur. N'Dour appeared in a joint Spain-Senegal ad campaign to inform the African public about the dramatic consequences of illegal immigration. He participated in the Stock Exchange of Visions project in 2007.

In 2008, he joined the Fondation Chirac's honour committee. The same year, Youssou N'Dour's microfinance organization named Birima ("Birima" is also a song's title) was launched with the collaboration of United Colors of Benetton.

In 2009, he released his song "Wake Up (It's Africa Calling)" under a Creative Commons license to help IntraHealth International in their IntraHealth Open campaign to bring open source health applications to Africa. The song was remixed by a variety of artists including Nas, Peter Buck of R.E.M., and Duncan Sheik to help raise money for the campaign.

N'Dour is a supporter of the Campaign for the Establishment of a United Nations Parliamentary Assembly, an organisation which advocates for democratic reformation of the United Nations.

N'Dour is a member of the Canadian charity Artists Against Racism.

Political career
At the beginning of 2012, he announced plans to stand as a candidate in the 2012 Senegalese presidential election, competing against President Abdoulaye Wade. However, he was disqualified from running in the election over the legitimacy of the signatures he had collected to endorse his campaign. N'Dour backed the opposition candidate Macky Sall, who defeated Wade in a second round of voting in March 2012. N'Dour was appointed as Minister of Culture and Tourism in April 2012 as part of the cabinet of new Prime Minister Abdoul Mbaye. The story of N'Dour's presidential campaign was filmed for the PBS TV program Sound Tracks: Music Without Borders. Later his portfolio was modified and he was appointed as Minister of Tourism and Leisure. He was dismissed from that post on 2 September 2013, when a new government under Prime Minister Aminata Touré was appointed. N'Dour was instead appointed as Special Adviser to the President, with the rank of minister, and tasked with promoting the country abroad.

Awards and nominations
{| class="wikitable sortable plainrowheaders" 
|-
! scope="col" | Award
! scope="col" | Year
! scope="col" | Category
! scope="col" | Nominee(s)
! scope="col" | Result
! scope="col" class="unsortable"| 
|-
! scope="row"| Brit Awards
| 1995
| International Male Solo Artist
| Himself
| 
|
|-
! scope="row"|Danish Music Awards
| 1995
| Best International Song
| "7 Seconds"
| 
|
|-
! scope="row"| Edison Award
| 1994
| Best Pop International
| The Guide (Wommat)
| 
|
|-
! scope="row" rowspan=6|Grammy Awards
| 1993
| rowspan=3|Best World Music Album
| Eyes Open
| 
|rowspan=6|
|-
| 1995
| The Guide (Wommat)
| 
|-
| 2001
| Joko: The Link
| 
|-
| 2004
| rowspan=3|Best Contemporary World Music Album
| Nothing's In Vain (Coono du Réér)
| 
|-
| 2005
| Egypt
| 
|-
| 2009
| Rokku Mi Rokka
| 
|-
! scope="row"|Ivor Novello Awards
| 1995
| International Hit of the Year
| "7 Seconds"
| 
|
|-
! scope="row"| La Mar de Música Awards
| 2020
| Festival Award
| rowspan=6|Himself
| 
|
|-
! scope="row" | Lunas del Auditorio
| 2004
| Espectaculo Alternativo
| 
|
|-
! scope="row" rowspan=4|MOBO Awards
| 2001
| rowspan=3|Best World Music Act
| 
|
|-
|2003
| 
|
|-
| 2004
| 
|
|-
|2005
|Best African Act
| 
|
|-
! scope="row"| MTV Europe Music Awards
| 1994
| Best Song
| "7 Seconds"
| 
|
|-
! scope="row"| Montreal International Jazz Festival
| 2011
| Antonio Carlos Jobim Award
| rowspan=3|Himself
| 
|
|-
! scope="row"|Polar Music Prize
| 2013
| Polar Music Prize
| 
|
|-
! scope="row"|Praemium Imperiale
| 2017
| Music
| 
|
|-
! scope="row" rowspan=2|Victoires de la Musique
| 2001
| rowspan=2|World Music Album of the Year
| Joko
| 
|
|-
| 2011
| Dakar – Kingston
| 
|

Discography

Early cassettes
This numbered series of cassettes was released in Senegal between 1982 and 1988, and was credited to Youssou N'Dour & Le Super Etoile de Dakar.

 Vol 1 Tabaski
 Vol 2 Ndakarou
 Vol 3 Independence
 Vol 4 Banjoly N'Diaye
 Vol 5 Yarou
 Vol 6 Marguedy
 Vol 7 Daby
 Vol 8 Immigres
 Vol 9 Africa
 Vol 10 Ndobine
 Vol 11 Bekoor
 Vol 12 Jamm
 Vol 13 Kocc Barma
 Vol 14 Gainde

Albums

Ndiadiane Ndiaye (1982)
Mouride (1982)
Independance Vol. 3 (1982)
Show!!! A Abidjan (1983)
Djamil Inédits 84-85 (1985)
Immigrés (1985)
Nelson Mandela (1985)
The Lion (1989)
Set (1990)
Eyes Open (1992)
The Guide (Wommat) (1994)
Gainde – Voices from the Heart of Africa (1995)
Djamil (1996) – anthology
Lii (1996)
St. Louis (1997)
Special Fin D'annee Plus (1998)
Le Grand Bal a Évry (1999)
Rewmi (1999)
Joko: From Village to Town (2000)
Joko: The Link (2000)
Le Grand Bal (2000)
Ba Tay (2001)
Le Grand Bal a Bercy (2001)
Nothing's in Vain (Coono Du Réér) (2002)
Kirikou Et La Sorciere (2004)
Egypt (2004)
Jigeen Gni (2005) – single
Alsaama Day (2007)
Rokku Mi Rokka (2007) – No. 30 in Rolling Stones Top 50 Albums of 2007.
I Bring What I Love (2008) – film soundtrack
Special Fin D'annee: Salagne-Salagne (2009)
Dakar – Kingston (2010)
Mbalakh Dafay Wakh (2011)
Fatteliku (2014)
#Senegaal Rek (2016)
Africa Rekk (2016)
Seeni Valeurs (2017)
Respect (2018)
History (2019)
Mbalax (2021)

Compilation albums
Diongoma (1983)
Special Noël (1993)
The Best Of Youssou N'Dour (1995)
Euleuk Sibir with Omar Pene (You et Pene) (1996)
Immigrés/Bitim Rew (1997)
Inedits 84–85 (1997)
Best of the 80's (1998)
Hey You: The Essential Collection 1988–1990 (1998)
Birth Of A Star (2001)
Youssou N'Dour and His Friends (2002)
The Rough Guide To Youssou N'Dour & Etoile de Dakar (2002)
Céy You (2003)
Le Grand Bal: Paris-Bercy (2003)
4.4.44 (2004)
Bercy 2004 vol. 1 & 2 (2004)
7 Seconds: The Best Of Youssou N'Dour (Remastered) (2004)
Bercy 2005 (2005)
Le Grand Bal: Bercy 2008 (2008) 
From Senegal to the world (2012)
Le Grand Bal: Bercy 2013 (2013)
Africa Rekk (Réédition) (2017)
Raxas Bercy 2017 (2017)
Le Grand Show (2019)

Collaborations
 1986: So from Peter Gabriel –- backing vocals on "In Your Eyes".
 1989: Passion from Peter Gabriel – backing vocals on "A Different Drum", "Passion".
 1990: Shaking the Tree: Sixteen Golden Greats from Peter Gabriel - "Mercy Street" and "Shaking the Tree".
 1990: Le mani e l'anima from Italian singer Claudio Baglioni - "Oltre" album.
 2000: Album Solidays – song "Qui sait?" – for the association Solidarité sida – with Anggun, Patrick Bruel, Stephan Eicher, Faudel, Peter Gabriel, Lââm, Lokua Kanza, Nourith, Axelle Red & Zucchero.
 2003: Hit from Peter Gabriel – backing vocals on "In Your Eyes".
 2005: Live 8: One Day, One Concert, One World – DVD Various Artists - Youssou N'Dour sings "7 Seconds" with Dido.
 2005: Live 8 Paris : DVD Various Artists – N'Dour sings at the end of the concert "New Africa/Lima Weesu".
 2007: Instant Karma: The Amnesty International Campaign To Save Darfur Various Artists – N'Dour sings "Jealous Guy". 
 2008: Bord Ezanga Kombo from Koffi Olomide – N'Dour on "Festival". 
 2009: Les Amis Du Monde with the Lebanese diva Majida El Roumi for The Francophone Games Opening – 2009 in Beirut
 2020: Twice as Tall from Burna Boy – on track 4
 2020: L'Ours with Christophe Maé

Singles

Films
Amazing Grace (2006)
As Olaudah Equiano. "A central figure in the abolitionist movement in Great Britain, Olaudah Equiano (c. 1745–97) wrote an eyewitness account of his life as a slave and of his work in the anti-slavery movement: The Interesting Narrative of the Life of Olaudah Equiano."
As a musician on the film's soundtrack.
Retour à Gorée (2007)
As himself, journeying from the island of Gorée to the USA and back, exploring the origins of jazz, which go back to the era of slave trade in Africa, through a concert performed by an international group of artists.
Youssou N'Dour: I Bring What I Love (2008)
As himself, through the recording of the Egypt album and its repercussions.
Released in the US on DVD by Oscilloscope Laboratories.

Notes

References

External links

 – official site 

Youssou N'Dour at African Music Encyclopedia
Youssou N'Dour interview at Afropop Worldwide, May 2004
Youssou N'Dour World Music Legends at GlobalRhythm.net
Youssou N'Dour article Senegal Superstar Wins Grammy for "Egypt" at World Beat Planet, 16 February 2005
Youssou N'Dour article Youssou N'Dour, "Egypt" and Islam on National Public Radio

Youssou N'Dour film Youssou N'Dour: I bring what I love at IMDb
Youssou N'Dour role in the film Amazing Grace
Youssou N'Dour video interview Visions of Youssou N'Dour on Stock Exchange of Visions
Youssou N'Dour at IntraHealth Open, featuring N'Dour's track "Wake Up (It's Africa Calling)"

Serer singers
Serer politicians
1959 births
Living people
21st-century Senegalese male singers
People from Dakar
Wolof-language singers
English-language singers from Senegal
French-language singers
Grammy Award winners
MTV Europe Music Award winners
Senegalese Muslims
World music musicians
Culture ministers of Senegal
Tourism ministers of Senegal
Male songwriters
20th-century Senegalese male singers